Orthacris is a genus of grasshoppers in the family Pyrgomorphidae and the subfamily Orthacridinae. Species are found in the Indian subcontinent including Sri Lanka.

Species
The Catalogue of Life and Orthoptera Species File list the following:
Orthacris ceylonica Kirby, 1914
Orthacris comorensis Singh & Kevan, 1965
Orthacris curvicerca Kevan, 1953
Orthacris elongata Kevan, 1953
Orthacris filiformis Bolívar, 1884
Orthacris gracilis Kevan, 1953
Orthacris maindroni Bolívar, 1905
Orthacris major Kevan, 1953
Orthacris elegans Bolívar, 1902
Orthacris incongruens Carl, 1916
Orthacris ramakrishnai Bolívar, 1917
Orthacris robusta Kevan, 1953
Orthacris ruficornis Bolívar, 1902

Gallery

References

External links

Caelifera genera
Pyrgomorphidae